Omsukchan is an urban locality (an urban-type settlement) and the administrative center of Omsukchansky District of Magadan Oblast, Russia, located  north of Magadan. Population:

History
Omsukchan was founded in the 1930s after natural resources were discovered in the region. It was granted urban-type settlement status in 1953. 

The settlement's name comes from Omchikan, which means "little marsh" in the Even language.

Geography
Omsukchan is a mountain town that lies in the western shore of Sugoy River, a tributary of Kolyma River. It is 27 km east of Dukat, the other town in the raion, and 22 km north of the ghost town of Galimy. The Omsukchan Range, highest ridge of the Kolyma Mountains, rises to the west and northwest of the town.

Demographics

Economy
The economy is based on extraction of gold, silver and coal.

Transport
Omsukchan has a 250 km road to the R504 Kolyma Highway, and has the Omsukchan Airport. There are regular bus and flight connections to Magadan.

The Anadyr Highway is under construction east from Omsukhan towards Anadyr.

Climate

See also

Dukat
Goltsovoye mine
List of urban localities in the Russian Far East

Notable residents 

Ilya Moseychuk (born 2000), football player
Yevgenia Uvarkina (born 1974), businesswoman and politician

References

External links

Information about Omsukchan 
Omsukchan on geographic.org

Urban-type settlements in Magadan Oblast